= Idiobiology =

Idiobiology is a branch of biology which studies individual organisms, or the study of organisms as individuals.
